Elachista hookeri is a moth in the family Elachistidae. It was described by John S. Dugdale in 1971. It is found in New Zealand, where it has been recorded from the Auckland Islands.

The species has brachypterous males and females.

References

Moths described in 1971
hookeri
Moths of New Zealand
Fauna of the Auckland Islands
Endemic fauna of New Zealand
Endemic moths of New Zealand